Graham V. Hartstone (born in June 1944) is a British sound engineer. He has been nominated for three Academy Awards in the category Best Sound. He has worked on over 190 films since 1962.

Selected filmography
 Superman (1978)
 A Passage to India (1984)
 Aliens (1986)

References

External links

Living people
1944 births
People from Uxbridge
British audio engineers
Best Sound BAFTA Award winners